is a railway station in the city of Toyota, Aichi, Japan, operated by Meitetsu.

Lines
Mikawa Yatsuhashi Station is served by the Meitetsu Mikawa Line and is 3.8 kilometers from the terminus of the line at Chiryū Station.

Station layout

The station  has a single elevated island platform with the station building underneath. The station has automated ticket machines, Manaca automated turnstiles and is unattended.

Platforms

Adjacent stations

|-
!colspan=5|Nagoya Railroad

Station history
Mikawa Yatsuhashi Station was opened on July 5, 1920, as a station on the privately owned Mikawa Railway. The Mikawa Railway was merged with Meitetsu on June 1, 1941. The tracks were elevated and station building reconstructed from 2007 to 2009.

Passenger statistics
In fiscal 2017, the station was used by an average of 3337 passengers daily (boarding passengers only).

Surrounding area
 Wakazono Junior High School

See also
 List of Railway Stations in Japan

References

External links

 Official web page 

Railway stations in Japan opened in 1920
Railway stations in Aichi Prefecture
Stations of Nagoya Railroad
Toyota, Aichi